God Bay (Baie de Vielles) is a natural bay on the island of Newfoundland in the province of Newfoundland and Labrador, Canada. The village of Burnt Islands is located by the bay.

References

Bays of Newfoundland and Labrador